Bayne was an unincorporated community in King County, Washington. It was a coal mining town that was abandoned in the years after the mine closed around 1950.

References

Unincorporated communities in King County, Washington
Unincorporated communities in Washington (state)